Nazarovo is a rural locality (a village) in Pekshinskoye Rural Settlement, Petushinsky District, Vladimir Oblast, Russia. The population was 2 as of 2010.

Geography 
Nazarovo is located 31 km north of Petushki (the district's administrative centre) by road. Kuzyayevo is the nearest rural locality.

References 

Rural localities in Petushinsky District